Henn Saari (15 February 1924 Narva – 8 September 1999 Tallinn) was an Estonian linguist.

In 1963 he graduated from Tartu University in Estonian philology. 1959-1975 he worked at the journal Keel ja Kirjandus. Since 1975 he was a senior research fellow at Estonian Language Institute.

His main fields of research were the theory of literary language, grammar of Estonian language, Estonian names, language management.

Since 1962 he was a member of Mother Tongue Society; 1990-1992 its chairperson.

Awards
 1989: Wiedemann Language Award

Works

 Nimekirjutusraamat: vene, ukraina, valgevene, gruusia, armeenia, aserbaidžaani, kasahhi, kirgiisi, tadžiki, turkmeeni, usbeki (1993, one of the authors) 
 Ein Weg zur Wortgrammatik am Beispiel des Estnischen  = Tee sõnagrammatikale eesti keele näitel (1997)

References

1924 births
1999 deaths
Linguists from Estonia
University of Tartu alumni
People from Narva
Burials at Metsakalmistu